Josef Mukařovský (6 April 1851, Mainz – 1 November 1921, Klatovy) was a Czech painter and illustrator.

Biography 
He was born in Germany, to the family of a military officer stationed there. When he was eight, they returned to Prague. He attended schools there and in Vienna, and graduated from a painting academy; possibly in either city. After 1870, he contributed illustrations to various magazines, notably Světozor; publishing over 400 in the course of fourteen years.

In the 1880s, he visited Munich. He eventually settled there, started a family, and became involved in its cultural life. There, he did illustrations for German magazines, and acted as host to many German and Czech cultural figures; being given the nickname "Muki". He also illustrated the novel,  (The Bear Hunter's Son), by Karl May.  

Shortly before World War I, he returned home. for family reasons, and bought a home in Domažlice. He still provided illustrations for German publications until the war interfered. After the war, he concentrated on doing portraits of the local people. Unaffected by modern trends, his work continued to be of a practical nature. He was remembered as a happy, pleasant person.

References

External links 

 Works by and about Mukařovský @ the National Library of the Czech Republic

1851 births
1921 deaths
Czech painters
Czech illustrators
Artists from Prague